Pulfero is a comune (municipality) in the Province of Udine in the Italian region Friuli-Venezia Giulia, located about  northwest of Trieste and about  northeast of Udine, on the border with Slovenia, and borders the following municipalities: Faedis, Kobarid (Slovenia), San Pietro al Natisone, Savogna, and Torreano.

Pulfero localities (Frazioni) include: Antro/Landar, Biacis/Bijača, Brischis/Brišča, Calla/Kau, Cicigolis/Ščigla, Coliessa/Kolieša, Comugnero/Kamunjar, Cras/Kras, Erbezzo/Arbeč, Goregnavas/Gorenja Vas, Ialig/Jalči, Lasiz/Laze, Linder/Linder, Loch/Log, Mersino (collectiv name of following villages: Bardo/Nabardo, Clin/Klin, Ierep/Jerebi, Iuretig/Juretiči, Marseu/Marsieli, Medves/Medvieži, Oballa/Obali, Pozzera/Pocera, Zorza/Žorži), Molino/Malin, Montefosca/Čarni Varh, Paceida/Pačejda, Pegliano/Ofijan (collectiv name of following villages: Cedarmas/Čedarmaci, Cocianzi/Kočjanci, Dorbolò/Dorboli, Flormi/Floram, Parmizi/Parmici, Sosgne/Šošnja, Stonder/Štonderi), Perovizza/Peruovca, Podvarschis/Podvaršč, Pulfero/Podbuniesac, Rodda (collectiv name of following villages: Bizonta/Bizonti, Brocchiana/Bročjana, Buttera/Butera, Clavora/Klavora, Cranzove/Kranjcove, Domenis/Domejža, Lacove/Lahove, Oriecuia/Oriehuje, Ossiach/Ošjak, Pocovaz/Pokovac, Puller/Pulerji, Scubina/Skubini, Sturam/Šturmi, Tumaz/Tuomac, Uodgnach/Uodnjak, Zeiaz/Zejci), Spagnut/Podšpanjud, Specognis/Špehuonja, Spignon/Varh, Stupizza/Štupca, Tarcetta/Tarčet, Zapatocco/Zapatok.

As of 31 December 2011, it had a population of 1,047 and an area of 48.1 km2.

Ethnic composition

84.6% of the population were Slovenes according to the census 1971.

Demographic evolution

References

Gallery

See also
Venetian Slovenia
Friuli
Slovene Lands

Cities and towns in Friuli-Venezia Giulia